Czechoslovakia competed at the 1972 Summer Olympics in Munich, West Germany. 181 competitors, 145 men and 36 women, took part in 93 events in 17 sports.

Medalists

Athletics

Men's 100 metres
Juraj Demec
 First Heat — 10.66s (→ did not advance)

Men's 800 metres
Jozef Plachý
 Heat — 1:47.1
 Semifinals — 1:48.9 (→ did not advance)

Men's 1500 metres
Jozef Horčic
 Heat — 3:45.7 (→ did not advance)

Men's 5000 metres
Josef Janský
 Heat — 13:39.8 (→ did not advance)
Dusan Moravcik
 Heat — 13:40.4 (→ did not advance)

Men's 4 × 100 m Relay
Jaroslav Matousek, Juraj Demec, Jiri Kynos, and Luděk Bohman
 Heat — 39.31s 
 Semifinals — 39.01s
 Final — 38.82s (→ 4th place)

Men's High Jump
Roman Moravec
 Qualification Round — 2.12m (→ did not advance)
Jaroslav Alexa
 Qualification Round — 2.09m (→ did not advance)

Basketball

Boxing

Canoeing

Cycling

Fifteen cyclists represented Czechoslovakia in 1972.

Individual road race
 Jiří Prchal — 18th place
 Jiří Háva — 41st place
 Petr Matoušek — 47th place
 Alois Holík — did not finish (→ no ranking)

Team time trial
 Miloš Hrazdíra
 Jiří Mainuš
 Petr Matoušek
 Vlastimil Moravec

Sprint
 Vladimír Vačkář
 Ivan Kučírek

1000m time trial
 Anton Tkáč
 Final — 1:08.78 (→ 13th place)

Tandem
 Ivan Kučírek and Vladimír Popelka → 8th place

Individual pursuit
 Milan Puzrla

Team pursuit
 Zdeněk Dohnal
 Jiří Mikšík
 Anton Tkáč
 Milan Zyka

Diving

Fencing

Two fencers, one man and one woman, represented Czechoslovakia in 1972.

Men's foil
 František Koukal

Women's foil
 Katarína Lokšová-Ráczová

Gymnastics

Handball

Czechoslovakia won a silver medal at the second Olympic handball tournament.  In the first round, the team tied for second place in the points ranking after defeating Tunisia, tying Iceland, and losing to East Germany.  Czechoslovakia won the tie-breaker over the Iceland team, which had also defeated Tunisia and lost to East Germany, and advanced to the second round.  There, wins over Sweden and the Soviet Union put Czechoslovakia in another standings tie, this time in first place with East Germany.  Again, the tie-breaker went to Czechoslovakia, giving the team the opportunity to play Yugoslavia, the winner of the other group, in the gold medal game.  Yugoslavia won, 21-16, leaving Czechoslovakia with the silver.

Men's Team Competition:
 Czechoslovakia - silver medal (3-2-1)

Judo

Rowing

Men's Single Sculls
Jaroslav Hellebrand
Heat — 7:58.15
Repechage — 8:19.28
Semi Finals — 8:44.60 
B-Final — 8:11.04 (→ 12th place)

Men's Coxed Pairs
Oldřich Svojanovský, Pavel Svojanovský and Vladimír Petříček
Heat — 7:41.27
Semi Finals — 8:07.88
Final — 7:19.57 (→  Silver Medal)

Sailing

Shooting

Eight male shooters represented Czechoslovakia in 1972.

25 m pistol
 Ladislav Falta
 Vladimír Hurt

50 m pistol
 Hynek Hromada
 Miroslav Štefan

300 m rifle, three positions
 Karel Bulan
 Rudolf Pojer

50 m rifle, three positions
 Petr Kovářík
 Karel Bulan

50 m rifle, prone
 Jiří Vogler
 Rudolf Pojer

Swimming

Volleyball

Men's team competition
Team Roster
Vladimír Petlák
Milan Vápenka
Pavel Schenk
Zdeněk Groessl
Stefan Pipa
Jaroslav Tomáš
Drahomír Koudelka
Jaroslav Stančo
Lubomír Zajíček
Jaroslav Penc
Milan Řezníček
Miroslav Nekola
Head coaches: Karel Láznička and Zdeněk Malý

Weightlifting

Wrestling

References

Nations at the 1972 Summer Olympics
1972 Summer Olympics
Summer Olympics